Stephen Levin may refer to:

 Stephen E. Levin (born 1932), member of the Pennsylvania House of Representatives
 Stephen Levin (politician) (born 1981), New York City councillor
 Stephen M. Levin (1941–2012), professor of occupational medicine